Na Balada is a live album by Brazilian recording artist Michel Teló. The album became popular because of the international hit single "Ai Se Eu Te Pego" included as the opening track.

CD track listing
CD
"Ai Se Eu Te Pego" (2:50)
"Humilde Residência" (3:13)
"Coincidência" (3:03)
"Vamo Mexê" Part. especial: Bruninho & Davi (2:44)	
"Se Eu Não For" (2:50)
"Desce do Muro" (2:31)	
"Pra Ser Perfeito" (3:07)	
"Pensamentos Bons" Part. esp.: Teófilo Teló (3:21)	
"Se Intrometeu" (2:47)	
"Eu Te amo e Open Bar" (3:22)	
"Fugidinha" (3:07)	
"Ponto Certo" (3:16)	
"É Mara" (2:53)	
Pop-porri (medley) "Telefone Mudo" / "Boate Azul" (3:28)	
"Vida Bela Vida" (4:02)
Re-Release (2012)
"If I Catch You (Chill Version I)" (2:51)
"Ai Se Eu Te Pego (Worldwide RMX)" (Feat. Pitbull) (4:05)
"Bara Bará Bere Berê" (2:44)

DVD track listing
The songs are slightly in different order with an additional track "Ei, psiu beijo me liga" included.

The DVD also includes 3 bonuses being music videos for "Pra ser perfeito" and "Ai se eu te pego!" and a feature "Making of"

"Ai Se Eu Te Pego!"
"Humilde Residência"
"Coincidência"
"Se Intrometeu"	
"Se Eu Não For"
"Pra Ser Perfeito"
"Desce do Muro"
"Pensamentos Bons" (Part. especial Teofiló Teló)
"Eu Te Amo e Open Bar"
"Fugidinha" 	
"Ponto Certo" 	
"Vamo Mexê" (Part. especial Bruninho & Davi)
"É Mara" 	
Pop-porri (medley)  "Telefone Mudo" / "Boate Azul"	
"Vida Bela Vida"
"Ei, Psiu Beijo Me Liga"
Bonus:
Music clip "Pra ser Perfeito"
Music clip "Ai Se Eu Te Pego!"
Making Of

Chart positions

Charts and certifications

Chart positions

Certifications

Year-end charts

See also
List of certified albums in Romania

References

2011 live albums
Portuguese-language live albums
Michel Teló live albums